Jami Äijänen (born 18 April 1996, in Järvenpää) is a Finnish professional squash player. As of February 2018, he was ranked number 174 in the world.

References

1996 births
Living people
Finnish male squash players
People from Järvenpää
Sportspeople from Uusimaa